Saint-Laurent-les-Bains-Laval-d'Aurelle is a commune in the Ardèche department in southern France. The municipality was established on 1 January 2019 by merger of the former communes of Saint-Laurent-les-Bains and Laval-d'Aurelle.

See also
Communes of the Ardèche department

References

Saintlaurentlesbainslavaldaurelle
Communes nouvelles of Ardèche
Populated places established in 2019
2019 establishments in France